Benjamin Weger (born 5 October 1989) is a Swiss biathlete.

His first World Cup podium was in the Pokljuka 20 km individual 16 December 2010.

Biathlon results
All results are sourced from the International Biathlon Union.

Olympic Games
0 medals

*The mixed relay was added as an event in 2014.

World Championships
0 medals

*During Olympic seasons competitions are only held for those events not included in the Olympic program.
**The mixed relay was added as an event in 2005.

References

External links
Profile on biathlonworld.com
Statistics

1989 births
Living people
Swiss male biathletes
Biathletes at the 2010 Winter Olympics
Biathletes at the 2014 Winter Olympics
Biathletes at the 2018 Winter Olympics
Biathletes at the 2022 Winter Olympics
Olympic biathletes of Switzerland
People from Brig-Glis
Sportspeople from Valais